Samarium(III) fluoride (SmF3) is a slightly hygroscopic solid fluoride. 
At room temperature, it has orthorhombic structure with space group Pnma – β-YF3 type with lattice constants a = 666,9 pm, b = 705,9 pm, c = 440,5 pm. Above 495 °C, it has the rhombohedral  LaF3 structure (space group P3cl) – with lattice constants a = 707, c = 724 pm.

Conditions/substances to avoid are: open flame, moisture, strong acids.

References

Fluorides
Samarium compounds
Lanthanide halides